Francisco Bolognesi Cervantes (November 4, 1816 – June 7, 1880) was a Peruvian military general. He is considered a national hero in Peru and was declared patron of the Army of Peru by the government of Peru on January 2 of 1951.

Early life and education 

Francisco Bolognesi was born in Lima on November 4, 1816. He attended the Seminary of Arequipa until he was 16 and then entered into a career in commerce.

His father, Andrés Bolognesi was of Italian-Peruvian background and was a violin player for the court of the Viceroy. Francisco Bolognesi had a son called Federico Pablo whose son was Federico Bolognesi Bolognesi (2nd Vicepresident of Peru). Federico Bolognesi Bolognesi had a daughter called Ana Maria Bolognesi who had two daughters called Ana Mamie and Selina Raguz Bolognesi.

Military career 
He was involved with the military in July 1844, in an action at Carmen Alto, a local district of Arequipa, south region of Perú. While offered a position in the military, he elected to remain in civilian life. However, in 1853, he enlisted and was selected as second in command of a cavalry regiment during a period of tension between Peru and Bolivia. While no armed conflict with Bolivia ensued, Bolognesi elected to remain in the military and took part in the revolution against then-President Echenique. After the successful revolution, Bolognesi was a Lieutenant Colonel on the General Staff.

In 1856, Bolognesi commanded the artillery involved in suppressing the revolt of General Manuel Ignacio de Vivanco, centered in the city of Arequipa, and was promoted to Colonel.

After several missions to Europe to help acquire weapons for Peru (especially artillery), Bolognesi returned to Peru in May 1866. He fell afoul of President Don Mariano Ignacio Prado and was imprisoned briefly in 1867. After the fall of Prado, Bolognesi returned to military service, commanding various artillery units of the Peruvian army, retiring in 1871 as Commander-in-Chief of the Artillery.

War of the Pacific 

When the War of the Pacific began in 1879 between Chile and the alliance of Peru and Bolivia, Bolognesi, now 62, rejoined the Peruvian Army and was active in actions against the Chilean forces, including the Battles of Dolores and Tarapacá in November 1879. In April 1880, he was placed in command of the Peruvian port of Arica.

He commanded the Peruvian forces surrounded in Arica by Chilean troops following the Chilean victory at Tacna. He organized and led a spirited defense of the port city by about 1,600 men against over 5,300 Chilean troops with extensive naval support.

When Chilean messengers demanded surrender of Arica because of their 3 to 1 numerical superiority, he replied, "Tengo deberes sagrados que cumplir y los cumpliré hasta quemar el último cartucho" ("I have sacred duties, and I will fulfill them until the last cartridge has been fired"). The expression "hasta quemar el último cartucho" ("Until the last cartridge has been fired") has passed into the Spanish language and is used today by the Peruvian Army as its official motto.

Thus the Battle of Arica began. The Chileans struck first, attacking fort Ciudadela where the battalions of Grandaderos (Tacna) and Artesanos (Arica) fought fiercely. The old Colonel Justo Arias y Araguez died in combat, while Corporal Alfredo Maldonado was killed in the explosion of a powder keg, that killed Peruvian, as well as ten Chilean soldiers. The Chileans responded by issuing the command to take no prisoners.

Bolognesi, Manuel J. La Torre, Alfonso Ugarte, Roque Saenz Pena y Juan Guillermo More gathered 400 Peruvian soldiers a top of the infamous hill known as El Morro. The Chileans stormed el Morro advancing from Cerro Gordo. In the midst of the fierce hand-to-hand combat that developed at the top of el Morro, Colonel Bolognesi was shot and wounded. Clenching his revolver he continued fighting until he was killed from a blow to the head (some speculate a bullet being the cause of death). His soldiers defended his remains until they too were eventually killed. Next to Bolognesi, Juan Guillermo More, Captain of the Navy and Chief of Artillery, fought to the end of his life with a revolver and sword in hand.

On June 7, 1880, the Chilean assault took Arica at a cost of 474 troops. Almost 1,000 of the Peruvian defenders, including Colonel Bolognesi, were killed in defense of the town.

The Peruvian casualty levels in the battle were so high because many of the wounded Peruvian prisoners were shot by the Chileans. The Chileans ransacked buildings, started fires and attacked Peruvian consulates amongst other crimes. The Chileans justified these acts saying they were seeking revenge for explosions caused by Peruvians in a few Chilean mines during the battle that caused some casualties.

Bolognesi's sons Enrique and Augusto also fought in the War of the Pacific, and died later, during the Battle of San Juan and the Battle of Miraflores in Lima.

See also 

War of the Pacific
Roque Sáenz Peña
Alfonso Ugarte
Coronel Bolognesi

External links
Biography of Francisco Bolognesi (in Spanish)
(in Spanish)

References

1816 births
1880 deaths
People from Lima
Peruvian military personnel of the War of the Pacific
Peruvian people of Italian descent
Italian people of Peruvian descent
Peruvian people of Spanish descent
Peruvian people of Basque descent
Peruvian soldiers
Military personnel killed in the War of the Pacific
Peruvian military personnel killed in action
Marshals of Peru